Yao Yushi (born 4 June 1989) is a Chinese sport shooter.

She participated at the 2018 ISSF World Shooting Championships, winning a medal.

References

External links

Living people
1989 births
Chinese female sport shooters
ISSF pistol shooters
Shooters at the 2018 Asian Games
Asian Games competitors for China